Clete Edmunson is a former American politician and educator from Idaho who served as a member of the Idaho House of Representatives from 2002 to 2007.

Early life and education 
Edmunson was born in Council, Idaho. He earned a degree in business and in history from Idaho State University. Edmunson earned a Master of Arts degree in history from Boise State University.

Career 
In 1986, Edmunson served as a city council member in Weiser, Idaho, until 1994.

In 1994, Edmunson became a teacher and a football coach. In 1996, Edmunson became a county commissioner of Washington County, Idaho.

On November 5, 2002, Edmunson won the election and became a Republican member of Idaho House of Representatives for District 9 seat B. Edmunson defeated Caryl A. Whitlatch with 79.8% of the votes. On November 2, 2004, as an incumbent, Edmunson won the election unopposed and continued serving District 9 seat B. On November 7, 2006, as an incumbent, Edmunson won the election unopposed and continued serving District 9 seat B.

In August 2007, Edmunson resigned as a member of Idaho House of Representatives for District 9 seat B. Edmunson later joined the staff of Idaho governor Butch Otter as a field representatives. In September 2009, Edmunson joined Idaho Department of Labor.

Edmunson later became a teacher at New Plymouth High School. In 2015, after Kevin Barker accepted a position as the superintendent, Edmunson became a principal at New Plymouth High School. In 2018, Edmunson resigned as principal at New Plymouth High School.
In July 2018, Edmunson became a  superintendent and school principal for Council School District.

Personal life 
Edmunson's is married to Shelly Edmunson. The couple lived in Weiser, Idaho before returning to Council, Idaho in 2018.

References 

Living people
Republican Party members of the Idaho House of Representatives
Date of birth missing (living people)
Place of birth missing (living people)
County commissioners in Idaho
People from Council, Idaho
People from Weiser, Idaho
Idaho city council members
Year of birth missing (living people)